Phir Wohi Mohabbat  is a Pakistani television series which started airing on Hum TV on 16 March 2017 every Thursday at 8:00 pm. It stars Ahmed Ali and Hania Amir as leads. The script was written by Mansoor Saeed and directed by Mohsin Mirza.

The show was dubbed in Pashto under the title Biya Hagha Meena and aired on Hum Pashto 1.

Plot 
The story begins with two brothers Ashar, the elder, and Yasir, the younger. They are married to two sisters with Yasir being married to the elder, Ramsha, and Ashar being married to the younger, Samra. Samra is pregnant and the couple already has a daughter named Alishba. Ramsha and Yasir share a son, Waleed. Living with them is the head of the household known as 'Dadi' by everyone. Raffiq is the family's servant who takes care of everything and is treated like a member of the family. He is especially close to Alishba who won't eat from anyone else's hand. At the time of Samra's baby shower, Raffiq brings along his pregnant wife and son on the instructions of Dadi. When Dadi begins the traditions on Raffiq's wife, Samra comes in and throws a fit that it's her baby shower. She is disgusted that a mere servant took her place. Due to her fit, Ashar has an argument with her telling her that if she acts so high and mighty over the servants, someday she will crash to the ground. The next day, it is raining heavily and Samra faces contractions. She refuses to go to the hospital with anyone aside from Ashar. In his haste to get to her, Ashar crashes into Raffiq's pregnant wife and son, killing them. He leaves in panic and arrives at the hospital to find his unborn child has also died. The family is hit with tragedy. A few days later, unable to bear the guilt, Ashar tells Yasir of the crime he committed. Raffiq overhears and in an act of revenge, kidnaps Alishba and takes her to some unknown village. Due to the shock, Samra is paralyzed from the waist-down.

FIFTEEN YEARS LATER . . .

Raffiq has raised Alishba as his own daughter along with a woman (Hamda Kaki) he calls his "sister". Alishba is now known as Alina. Raffiq is severely ill and the doctors suggest for him to go to Karachi to which he eventually agrees. On the other side, the family is preparing for Waleed's return from the US and his engagement to Sana. The two are shown as workaholics. Sana is especially rude to all of Waleed's family members which eventually leads to Waleed distancing himself from her. To earn some money for her father's (Raffiq) operation, Alishba begins working at her old house without knowing that she is their long-lost daughter. Eventually, the truth comes out and Raffiq begs for forgiveness after which he passes away from throat cancer. Alishba is re-introduced into the family and Samra, who was previously depressed, learns to live again. Alishba takes a while to adjust to her new life. Sana's mother isn't happy with the marriage causing them to move it up from one year to twenty days. During this time, Waleed's childhood friend, Sheheryar, comes along. He's shown as the opposite of Waleed, being lively and funny. Alishba and him get along and eventually Sheheryar falls in love with her. Dadi figures it out and arranges for the two to get married on the same day as Sana and Waleed. Waleed is facing a difficult time with Sana who is rude and stubborn. In the twenty-day gap between his marriage, he realizes that he is also in love with Alishba, much to the joy of Samra who has held on to Ramsha's promise that their children would marry one day. Waleed confesses his love for Alishba in front of Sana, her mother, Alishba and her father. Sana is upset and leaves at that moment regardless of it being only a night before their marriage. Alishba is distraught that Waleed would do this to her when she is supposed to marry Sheheryar. She refuses to marry Waleed but Sheheryar, who is under the misunderstanding that the entire household wants Waleed and Alishba to marry, leaves that night.

In the morning, Samra convinces Alishba to marry Waleed and they do so. Ramsha is very angry throughout since she still does not believe that Alishba is actually Samra's daughter. Initially, Alishba is not happy with Waleed since he broke her marriage causing people to doubt her honor. Ramsha adds fuel to the fire in attempt to break the two up. However, Samra continuously tells Alishba that Waleed loves her endlessly and that it would be foolish of her to not see that. Alishba finally decides to forget Sheheryar and move on with Waleed. The two fall in love, with Alishba confessing it in front of their family.

At this point, Sana returns with the aid of Ramsha. She's gone insane for Waleed and will do anything to gain him, including framing Hamda Kaki for thievery. She attempts suicide when Waleed doesn't talk to her and in order to prevent her from doing so again, he agrees to talk to her at night only. When Alishba asks, he says he's talking to a 'Canadian client'. When Ashar and Yasir wonder who this client is, Alishba grows suspicious. Alishba discovers she's pregnant and the whole family is overjoyed. Waleed tells Sana to forget him since he now has his own family. Sana is about the leave when Ramsha stops her and tells her to wait for a few more days. She clearly has a trick up her sleeves. A man is constantly calling Waleed, asking for his wife named "Hina". Waleed denies knowing her and the man, Rehmat, claims that Alishba is actually Hina and that she only married Waleed for his wealth. The entire family grows suspicious of Alishba's true identity and a DNA test is demanded to which Alishba refuses. This causes Waleed to doubt his wife. Alishba calls Hamda Kaki to back her story that she truly is Alishba. During this time, she also goes to meet Rehmat to demand why he would play such a sick joke on her when she doesn't even know who he is. Waleed sees the two together and confronts Alishba, accusing her of being Hina and lying to him. Hamda Kaki comes along and confirms that Alishba is in fact, only Alishba and that this Hina story is a fraud. Alishba, seeing how the family has doubted her (everyone except Samra believes that she is Hina), leaves with Hamda Kaki. She wants a divorce from Waleed but when the time comes, she cannot go through with it.

On the other end, Waleed has been pressurized to believe that Alishba has lied to him all this time. In attempt to get over her, he accepts to marry Sana, much to her happiness and his mother's satisfaction. During the wedding preparations, Waleed and Sana go to the mall where Sana sees Rehmat along with a woman and son. She contacts the woman and finds out that she is Rehmat's wife. On the day of Sana's nikkah with Waleed, Sana calls the woman and has her speak the truth in front of everyone. Ashar and Yasir also drag Rehmat inside who admits that he was paid by Ramsha to pretend that Alishba was Hina. The marriage breaks off for a second time and Waleed is angry at himself for not believing Alishba. When the entire family encourages him to go get her back, including Sana, Ramsha threatens that she'll kill herself if he does. Waleed walks away and she shoots herself, damaging her brain and paralyzing herself. At that time, Alishba goes into labor and Hamda Kaki is informed that they need more money for the operation. She calls Waleed who rushes to help his wife. Alishba gives birth to a son. Waleed begs for her forgiveness and she agrees. The family is reunited. A few days later, they plan on naming the baby. Alishba says Ramsha has a right to do so and Ramsha chooses the name 'Waqas'.

Cast

 Ahmed Ali Akbar as Waleed Yasir
 Hania Amir as Alishba Ashar/Alishba Waleed Yasir
 Salma Hassan as Ramsha, Waleed's mother 
 Shamoon Abbasi as Ashar, Alishba's father
 Zainab Qayyum as Samra, Alishba's mother 
 Jinaan Hussain as Sana, Waleed's ex-fiancé
 Shamil Khan as Yasir, Waleed's father 
 Haris Waheed as Sheheryar, Waleed's childhood friend and Alishba's ex-fiancé
 Humaira Bano
 Mariam Mirza

Former cast

 Saleem Mairaj as Raffiq, the family servant and Alishba's adoptive father (Dead)
 Shamim Hilaly as Dadi, the head of the household (Dead)

See also
2017 in Pakistani television
List of programs broadcast by Hum TV

References

External links

Pakistani drama television series
2017 Pakistani television series debuts
2017 Pakistani television series endings
Urdu-language television shows
Hum TV original programming